TJ Innova Engineering & Technology Co., Ltd., abbreviated as TJI, is a private design company for the automotive industry. They are specialized in creating vehicle concepts and in the building of design studies and concept cars. The company was founded in 1999 by Professor Leiled Tji and Tong Jian. The company is located in Shanghai.

History
Leiled Tji began his career in the automotive industry in 1989 with a cooperation with the First Automotive Works and in liaisons with the Changchun Auto Research Institute and the Harbin Industry University. Two years later he has founded the Auto Technology Institute as a part of the FAW Group. For his first time he had devoted himself to create design studies. In 1999 he founded TJI which was his first independent company. TJI worked for a lot of Chinese and Japanese companies.

TJI was the first Chinese company in using modern digital tools like 3D CAD. Currently the company employs more than 1,400 workers and receives orders from many renowned Chinese and Japanese companies. Famous series models from this design company are the Lifan 520, the Soueast/Mitsubishi Zinger and the Soueast Lioncel.  The most famous concept car from TJI is the TJ Innova Lightning supersportscar which was shown in its first generation on the 2005 Shanghai Auto Show. The first generation is very similar to the one year later introduced Ferrari 599 GTB. In the second generation which was presented in 2009 the model showed similarities to the Maserati GranTurismo and the Aston Martin DB9. TJ Innova is a registered brand name and trademark. TJI already has received a lot of several awards like the New Most Growth Enterprise, the Award for Innovation Elite of Yangtze Delta Area, Award for Science & Technology Progress and the Award for Special Contribution for Independent Design.

References

External links
Official webseite of the TJ Innova Engineering & Technology Co., Ltd.

Design companies of China
Automotive companies of China
Chinese companies established in 1999
Manufacturing companies based in Shanghai
Chinese brands
Design companies established in 1999